A Fachhochschule (plural Fachhochschulen), abbreviated FH, is a university of applied sciences (UAS), in other words a German tertiary education institution that provides professional education in many applied sciences and applied arts, such as engineering, technology, business, architecture, design, and industrial design.

Fachhochschulen were first founded in Germany and were later adopted in Austria, Liechtenstein, Switzerland, Cyprus, and Greece. An increasing number of Fachhochschulen are abbreviated as Hochschule, the generic term in Germany for institutions awarding academic degrees in higher education, or expanded as Hochschule für angewandte Wissenschaften (HAW), the German translation of "universities of applied sciences", which are primarily designed with a focus on teaching professional skills. Swiss law calls Fachhochschulen and universities "separate but equal".

Due to the Bologna process, universities and Fachhochschulen award legally equivalent bachelor's and master's degrees. Excepting research-intensive institutions in Hesse, Saxony Anhalt, Baden-Württemberg, North Rhine-Westphalia and Bavaria  Fachhochschulen do not award doctoral degrees themselves but sometimes in cooperation with award-granting partner universities. This and the rule that they appoint only professors with a professional career of at least three years outside the university system are the two major ways in which they differ from traditional universities.

Impact of the Bologna process

Due to the Bologna process, most German  and  have ceased admitting students to programs leading to the traditional German Diplom (FH), but now apply the new degree standard of Bachelor's and Master's degrees. In line with the Bologna process, bachelor's and master's degrees awarded by both types of universities ( and ) are legally equivalent.

In Germany

The Fachhochschule or University of Applied Sciences and Arts is a type of German institution of higher education that emerged from the traditional Engineering Schools and similar professional schools of other disciplines. It differs from the traditional university (Universität) mainly through its more practical orientation. Subjects taught at Fachhochschulen include engineering, computer science, business and management, arts and design, communication studies, social service, and other professional fields.

The traditional degree awarded at a Fachhochschule was the Diplom (FH). Coursework generally totaled six semesters (three years) of full-time study, with various options for specialization. In addition, there were one or two practical training semesters to provide hands-on experience in real working environments. The program concluded, usually after 3.5 – 4 years, with the final examination and a thesis (Diplomarbeit) which is usually an extensive project on a current practical or scientific aspect of the profession.

In an effort to make educational degrees more compatible within Europe, the German Diplom degrees were mostly phased out by 2010 and replaced by the European bachelor's and master's degree.

The Fachhochschule represents a close relationship between higher education and the employment system. Their practical orientation makes them very attractive to employers.

Today, Fachhochschulen also conduct research. Research projects are either publicly funded or sponsored by industry. Nevertheless, in Germany the right to confer doctoral degrees is still generally reserved to Universitäten. In 2016, however, Fulda University of Applied Sciences became the first Fachhochschule to be conferred this right for its graduate center for social sciences. Several Fachhochschulen run doctoral programs where the degree itself is awarded by a partner university in Germany or abroad (similar to the doctoral programs in German research institutes, such as the Fraunhofer Society or the Max Planck Society).

There are a few universities, such as Catholic University of Eichstätt-Ingolstadt and Bundeswehr University Munich, which run Fachhochschule courses in addition to their normal courses.

In Austria

The Austrian government decided to establish Fachhochschulen (FH) in 1990. In the academic year of 2010/11, there were twenty-one institutions officially considered as Fachhochschulen plus a number of other providers of Fachhochschulstudiengängen with a total of over 27,000 students. About a third of the 136 Fachhochschulstudiengänge are organized as part-time courses of studies.

In Switzerland
The Swiss Universities of Applied Sciences UAS are vocational universities established in Switzerland in 1995 following the model of the German Fachhochschulen. They are called Fachhochschule in German, Haute école specialisée in French and scuola universitaria professionale (SUP) in Italian. The Swiss Universities of Applied Sciences offer third level education, continuing education, services businesses and institutions, and produce applied research activities. In 2013 there are seven public UAS approved by the Swiss Federal Council in 1998 and two private UAS approved by the Federal Council in 2005 and 2008. The public UAS are run by one or more cantons.

UAS have the institutional mandate to provide degree programmes (Bachelor’s degrees and Master's degrees), continuing education and training, to conduct applied research and to offer services to companies and institutions. Students with a finished apprenticeship and a Fachmatura (subject Matura) and students with the Matura and a practical year in a company can access further education within the Universities for Applied Science. The UAS and their Bachelor’s and Master’s degrees are federally accredited.

The Federal Department of Economic Affairs, Education and Research (EAER) and is in charge of the accreditation of the UAS which are requested to meet the federal legislative requirements. 
The UAS are supported by the cantons, the Federal Department of Economic Affairs, Education and Research (EAER), the State Secretariat for Education, Research and Innovation (SERI) and by the Rector's Conference of Swiss Universities (swissuniversities).

See also
 Education in Switzerland
 Ammattikorkeakoulu
 College
 Institute of technology
 University of applied sciences
 Vocational university

References

Vocational education in Austria
Vocational education in Germany
Vocational education in Switzerland
Types of university or college
Universities of Applied Sciences
Higher education in Germany